
De León or de León or De Leon is a Spanish origin surname, often toponymic, in which case it may possibly indicate an ultimate family origin in the Kingdom of León or the later Province of León.

Geographical distribution
As of 2014, 29.7% of all known bearers of the surname de León were residents of the Philippines (frequency 1:647), 26.4% of Guatemala (1:116), 20.0% of Mexico (1:1,179), 8.1% of the Dominican Republic (1:244), 4.1% of Panama (1:182), 2.2% of the United States (1:31,581), 2.1% of Uruguay (1:313), 1.7% of Spain (1:5,084) and 1.0% of El Salvador (1:1,194).

In Spain, the frequency of the surname was higher than national average (1:5,084) in the following autonomous communities:
 1. Canary Islands (1:427)
 2. Community of Madrid (1:4,329)

In Guatemala, the frequency of the surname was higher than national average (1:116) in the following departments:
 1. San Marcos Department (1:35)
 2. Jutiapa Department (1:42)
 3. Quetzaltenango Department (1:45)
 4. Retalhuleu Department (1:49)
 5. El Progreso Department (1:72)
 6. Suchitepéquez Department (1:100)
 7. Izabal Department (1:106)

People
Notable people with the surname De León include,
  
 Beatrice de Leon British Theatre manager
 Carlos Enrique Díaz de León (1910–1971), Provisional President of Guatemala 1954
 Carlos de León (1959–2020), Puerto Rican boxer
 Charito de León (born 1939), Filipina actress
 Christopher de Leon (born 1956), Filipino actor and politician
 Daniel De Leon (1852–1914), Venezuelan-born Sephardic Jew, American socialist and trade unionist
 Diego de León y Navarrete (1807-1841), Spanish military figure
 Edwin de Leon (1818-1891), American/Confederate diplomat and writer
 Ernesto Zedillo Ponce de León (born 1951), former Mexican president
 Gerardo de León (1913–1981), Filipino film actor and director
 Gil de León (1916–????), Filipino film actor and director
 Jack de Leon British Theatre manager
 Jane De Leon (born 1998), Filipina actress, singer, model, and dancer
 Joaquín Velázquez de León, Minister of State of Mexico
 Joey de Leon (born 1946), Filipino comedian and television host
 José García de León y Pizarro (1770–1835), Minister of State of Spain 1816–1818
 José De León (born 1992), Puerto Rican baseball player
 Juan Manuel de León Merchante (1626–1680), Spanish dramatist
 Juan Ponce de León (1460–1521), Spanish explorer and conquistador
 Juan Ponce de León II (1524-1591), first Puerto Rican governor of Puerto Rico
 Juan Velázquez de León (died 1520), Spanish conquistador with Hernán Cortés
 Juana María de los Dolores de León Smith (1798–1872), wife of General Sir Harry Smith, Governor of the Cape Colony, South Africa
 Kathleen de Leon Jones (born 1977), Filipino-Australian singer, dancer, actress and television performer, Hi-5
 Lautaro De León (born 2001), Uruguayan footballer 
 Leonardo de León (born 2001), Rocket-League World Champion 2019 
 Luis de León (1527–1591), Spanish lyric poet and Augustinian friar
 Luis Ponce de León (governor of New Spain) briefly the governor of New Spain, from July 4, 1526 to July 16, 1526
 Mateo de la Mata Ponce de León ([?]-1720), Spanish colonial officer, interim viceroy of Peru 1716
 Mccoy De Leon (born 1995), Filipino actor and model
 Miguel de León (born 1962), Venezuelan actor
 Mike de León (Miguel de Leon) (born 1947), Filipino film director, scriptwriter, and producer
 Moses de León or Moshe ben Shem-Tov (1250–1305), Spanish rabbi and Kabbalist
 Nick DeLeon (born 1990), American soccer player for D.C. United
 Oscar de León (born 1943), Venezuelan singer
 Pedro Cieza de León (1520–1554), Jewish-origin New Christian Spanish conquistador and historian
 Pedro Ponce de León (1520-1584), Spanish Benedictine monk
 Perla de Leon (born 1952), American artist and photographer
 Rafael De Leon aka Roaring Lion (1908–1999), Trinidadian calypsonian
 Ramiro de León Carpio (1942–2002), President of Guatemala 1993–1996
 Rudy de Leon (born 1952), American Deputy Secretary of Defense
 Thomas Cooper de Leon (1839–1914), American journalist, author, and playwright
 Tiburcio de Leon, Filipino revolutionary general
 Victor De Leon III aka Lil Poison, (born May 6, 1998) recognized by Guinness Book of World Records as the youngest professional video game player

Fictional characters
Cervantes de León, character in the Soul Series of fighting games

Alec De Leon, EXO Squad Animated TV Series

References

Spanish-language surnames
Spanish toponymic surnames